The Men's team pursuit at the 2011 UCI Track Cycling World Championships was held on March 23. 17 nations of 4 cyclists each participated in the contest. After the qualifying, the fastest 2 teams raced for gold, and 3rd and 4th teams raced for bronze.

Results

Qualifying
Qualifying was held at 15:00.

Finals
The finals were held at 19:45.

References

2011 UCI Track Cycling World Championships
UCI Track Cycling World Championships – Men's team pursuit